Last Exit is the debut studio album by Canadian electronic music group Junior Boys. It was released on June 7, 2004 by KIN Records in the United Kingdom and on September 21, 2004 by Domino Recording Company in the United States. The album was promoted by two singles: "Birthday" and "High Come Down".

Last Exit received rave reviews from critics. The United States release contains a bonus disc adding songs previously only available on their EPs.

Critical reception 

Last Exit received highly positive reviews from music critics. The album holds a score of 89 out of 100 on the review aggregator website Metacritic, indicating "universal acclaim." Writing for Pitchfork, Scott Plagenhoef praised the album for its "deceptively simple and very approachable tracks" and remarked that songwriter Jeremy Greenspan was able "to fold elements of nearly a quarter-century of forward-looking pop into a distinct sound without sounding either conceptual or trading on contradictions or the smoke-and-mirrors of attention-grabbing eclecticism." Uncut wrote that "the contrast between romanticism and sonic daring, alien time signatures and freakishly pretty tunes, is irresistible." The Guardians Dorian Lynskey stated that Junior Boys' "spectral vision of electronic pop is an understated, unpredictable delight", while PopMatters Adrien Begrand called Last Exit "a warm, friendly, entirely accessible pop album." Andy Kellman of AllMusic noted that the album's songs "can be enjoyed with or without all of the analysis and context" and praised the duo's "ability to be alluringly aloof". Leah Greenblatt of Entertainment Weekly called the album "prettily nostalgic (think New Order, Erasure, Bronski Beat) and gloriously right now."

Accolades 
The song "Teach Me How to Fight" ranked at number 57 on Porcys' list of the best singles of 2000-2004, as well as number 16 on Screenagers' list of the best songs of the 2000s.

Acclaimed Music, a site which aggregates hundreds of critics' lists from around the world into an all-time ranking, declares the album as the 1591st most acclaimed of all-time.

*denotes an unordered list

Track listing

References 

2004 debut albums
Domino Recording Company albums
Junior Boys albums